The Exhibit: Finding the Next Great Artist is an American competition television series from  MTV and the Smithsonian Channel that premiered on March 3, 2023. The show features seven artists competing for a $100,000 prize and a solo exhibition at the Hirshhorn Museum and Sculpture Garden.

Format
Artists are given a topic or theme to respond to in each episode and a time limit to complete and mount their art for review. Each of the six episodes is hosted by Dometi Pongo of MTV News and features a different competition with a panel of judges headed by Hirshhorn director Melissa Chiu and two other judges that rotate throughout the series.Judges consider the "originality and execution" of the piece when assessing the work. The winner of each round is announced following a crit by the panel. There are no eliminations and all seven artists remain through the end of the series. The winner of the competition is announced at the end of the series, and may not have won any of the individual rounds.

Contestants
Jamaal Barber
Frank Buffalo Hyde
Clare Kambhu
Misha Kahn
Baseera Khan
Jillian Mayer
Jennifer Warren

Episodes

References

External links

 
 

2023 American television series debuts
2020s American music television series
MTV original programming
English-language television shows
Reality competition television series
Television series about art